The Vermeer Centre is an information center dedicated to the painter Johannes Vermeer and the work of his contemporaries in Delft, the Netherlands.

The building is a rebuilt version of the old local Guild of Saint Luke. The center works with local archeology groups and other heritage organisations to disseminate information about Delft during the lifetime of Vermeer. The center acts as a museum, though technically it does not own the original artifacts on display and therefore has not earned the Dutch label for "Museum". Based on scale copies of known artworks by Vermeer and his contemporaries, multi-media exhibition displays beginning in the basement lead the visitor literally upwards through time during the life of Johannes Vermeer, explaining the work of contemporaries and events that occurred during his lifetime. In the top floor an exhibition on his work methods is set up, with an opportunity for visitor to pose for a picture as Lady Writing a Letter with her Maid.

The ground floor contains a small gift store and book shop.

See also
 Rembrandthuis, a much longer established museum in Amsterdam focused on the painter Rembrandt

References

Buildings and structures in Delft
Painters from Delft
Tourist attractions in South Holland
Biographical museums in the Netherlands
Vermeer